Sir William Henry Dunn, 1st Baronet (8 October 1856 – 12 June 1926) was a British Conservative Party politician and 589th Lord Mayor of London.

Dunn was born in Clitheroe, in Lancashire. He was married to Ellen Pawle in 1885 and they had one son and a daughter.

By profession he was an auctioneer and surveyor, a Fellow of the Surveyors' Institution. He was a well-known figure in the business and civic life of the City of London. He was an Alderman of the City of London and Sheriff in 1906–1907. He was Lord Mayor of London in 1916–1917.   He was also a Liveryman of several of the City Guilds and an officer in the Territorial Force.

He was elected as Conservative Member of Parliament (MP) for Southwark West in the general election of January 1910, taking the seat from the sitting Liberal MP Richard Causton. However he lost the seat back to the Liberals in December 1910, losing to Edward Anthony Strauss.

He was knighted in 1907  and created a baronet in 1917. He was succeeded in the baronetcy by his son John Henry Dunn, who was only located many years later working at a coal mine near Barnsley.

References

External links 
 

|-

1856 births
1926 deaths
People from Clitheroe
Conservative Party (UK) MPs for English constituencies
UK MPs 1910
Sheriffs of the City of London
20th-century lord mayors of London
20th-century English politicians
Baronets in the Baronetage of the United Kingdom